Princess Maria Annunciata Isabella Filomena Sabasia of Bourbon-Two Sicilies (Italian: Maria Annunziata Isabella Filomena Sabasia, Principessa di Borbone delle Due Sicilie; 24 March 1843 – 4 May 1871) was a political figure from the House of Bourbon-Two Sicilies. In 1862 she married Archduke Karl Ludwig of Austria, however, their marriage was short-lived due to her death from tuberculosis in 1871. She is known for being the mother of Archduke Franz Ferdinand of Austria, whose assassination in Sarajevo precipitated the start of World War I.

Early years (1843-1861)
Maria Annunciata Isabella Filomena Sabasia, known as Maria Annunciata to the public and “Ciolla” to her family, was born on 24 March 1843 at the Royal Palace of Caserta to King Ferdinand II of the Two Sicilies and his wife, Archduchess Maria Theresa of Austria. She was the fourth of their twelve children, and the eldest daughter. She also had a half-brother, Francis, from his father's first marriage. Throughout her childhood and adulthood, Maria was known to be "calm, modest and reserved", while her mother enjoyed social life.

The death of Ferdinand
In 1859, Ferdinand, Maria’s father, died, and his older brother Francis claimed the throne of the Kingdom of the Two Sicilies. His reign ended in 1860 during the Expedition of the Thousand lead by Giuseppe Garibaldi, who overthrew the monarchy, and the people voted to join the Kingdom of Sardinia, under King Victor Emmanuel II of Sardinia.

Upon the invasion, Maria Theresa moved the family towards Gaeta. The family stayed in Rome after many weeks of traveling. There the family lived with Pope Pius IX at the Quirinal Palace. Then the family left for the Farnese Palace.

Marriage (1862-1870)
During the family’s stay in Rome, Maria was wedded to Archduke Karl Ludwig of Austria. The marriage by proxy took place on 16 October 1862 in Rome, and the wedding itself took place on 21 October 1862 in Venice. It was reported that the couple fell in love instantly upon seeing each other for the first time, though there is nothing to back this claim up. The marriage itself appeared to be a happy one.

One day after the wedding, however, Maria suffered from a seizure during mass. This in return caused many to worry over the Princess’s health, and the fact the seizure had taken place in front of members of the reigning House of Habsburg. Later on it was revealed Maria was afflicted with tuberculosis.

Maria suppressed her illness and attended balls, theater and opera.

Children
Despite Maria’s poor health, she gave birth to four children: Franz Ferdinand in 1863, Otto Franz in 1865, Ferdinand Karl in 1868 and Margarete Sophie in 1870.

Death and burial
After the birth of Margarete Sophie in 1870, Maria became very ill; it was evident that she wouldn't survive, much to the public's dismay. As her illness progressed, Maria spent her final days in agony, succumbing to tuberculosis on 4 May 1871 at the age of 28. Her burial took place in the Imperial Crypt at the Capuchin Church in Vienna, Austria.

Her husband, Archduke Karl Ludwig remarried two years after her death in 1873 to Infanta Maria Theresa of Portugal. They named their first child, Archduchess Maria Annunciata of Austria, after her.

Children

Ancestry

References

External links

1843 births
1871 deaths
People from Caserta
House of Habsburg
Austrian princesses
Princesses of Bourbon-Two Sicilies
19th-century deaths from tuberculosis
Tuberculosis deaths in Austria
Italian Roman Catholics
Burials at the Imperial Crypt
Daughters of kings

 Maria Annunciata official profile at Unofficial Royalty
 Maria Annunciata official profile at Find a Grave